Four Nights with Anna is a 2008 drama film directed by Jerzy Skolimowski. It stars Artur Steranko and Kinga Preis. It tells the story of a man who visits a woman in her sleep. The film had its world premiere as the opening film of the Directors' Fortnight section at the 2008 Cannes Film Festival on 15 May 2008. It was released in Poland on 12 September 2008, and in France on 5 November 2008.

Plot
A middle-aged man Leon lives in a small town in Poland. He works in the crematorium at the local hospital. Anna works as a nurse at the same hospital. Previously, he witnessed Anna being raped, but he was wrongfully accused and jailed for the crime. While Anna is asleep, Leon breaks into her apartment. During each of his visits, he leaves several traces of his presence by fixing a broken clock, sewing buttons on her clothes, painting her toenails, and bringing flowers and a ring.

Cast

Release
The film had its world premiere as the opening film of the Directors' Fortnight section at the 2008 Cannes Film Festival on 15 May 2008. It was also screened at the New Horizons Film Festival, the New York Film Festival, the Toronto International Film Festival, the Gdynia Film Festival, the Lisbon & Estoril Film Festival, and the Trieste Film Festival. It was released in Poland on 12 September 2008, and in France on 5 November 2008.

Reception

Critical reception
On review aggregator website Rotten Tomatoes, the film has an approval rating of 67% based on 6 reviews, and a weighted average rating of 5.6/10.

Erene Stergiopoulos of Exclaim! wrote, "Quite simply, Four Nights with Anna is as subtle as it is complex, and is definitely one to watch." Derek Elley of Variety commented that "[Jerzy Skolimowski's] period as an artist and poet seems to have served him well, more in the film's overall precision and small details than in its look." Peter Brunette of The Hollywood Reporter described the film as "an exercise in tedium marked by only the tiniest of redeeming moments." Akiva Gottlieb of Slant Magazine gave the film 1.5 out of 4 stars, writing, "Without attempting even a superficial inquiry into the kinks of voyeurism, Skolimowski's return to the big screen is only interested in soiling its viewer with a cheap and gimmicky moral relativism."

Accolades

References

External links
 

2008 films
2008 drama films
2000s Polish-language films
Polish drama films
French drama films
Films directed by Jerzy Skolimowski
Films produced by Paulo Branco
Films scored by Michał Lorenc
Films with screenplays by Jerzy Skolimowski
2000s French films